San Alberto Airport  is an airport serving the city of Siquirres in Limón Province, Costa Rica.

See also

 Transport in Costa Rica
 List of airports in Costa Rica

References

External links
 OurAirports - San Alberto
 OpenStreetMap - San Alberto
 HERE Maps - San Alberto
 FallingRain - San Alberto

Airports in Costa Rica
Limón Province